Pacing and Clinical Electrophysiology  (PACE) is a peer-reviewed medical journal that publishes papers in cardiac pacing, clinical and basic cardiac electrophysiology, cardioversion-defibrillation, the electrical stimulation of other organs, cardiac assist, and, in general, the management of cardiac arrhythmias.

Abstracting and indexing 
The journal is abstracted and indexed in Current Contents, EMBASE, MEDLINE, Science Citation Index, and Scopus.

External links 
 

Cardiology journals
Monthly journals
English-language journals
Publications established in 1978
Wiley-Blackwell academic journals